Rangeley Lake Seaplane Base  is a privately owned, public use seaplane base on Rangeley Lake, located two nautical miles (4 km) north of the central business district of Rangeley, a town in Franklin County, Maine, United States.

Facilities and aircraft 
Rangeley Lake Seaplane Base has one seaplane landing area designated 6/24 with a water surface measuring 7,000 x 1,000 feet (2,134 x 305 m). For the 12-month period ending August 16, 2010, the airport had 200 general aviation aircraft operations, an average of 16 per month.

See also 
 Steven A. Bean Municipal Airport at

References

External links 

 Aerial image as of June 1997 from USGS The National Map
 
 

Airports in Maine
Transportation buildings and structures in Franklin County, Maine
Seaplane bases in the United States